Welltown is an unincorporated community in northern Frederick County, Virginia, United States.

Historic sites 
Galilee Church
Welltown United Methodist Church

References

Unincorporated communities in Frederick County, Virginia
Unincorporated communities in Virginia